The Hungarian Defense is a chess opening that begins with the moves:
1. e4 e5
2. Nf3 Nc6
3. Bc4 Be7

The Hungarian Defense is a line in the Italian Game typically chosen as a  response to the aggressive 3.Bc4. With the move 3...Be7, Black avoids the complexities of the Giuoco Piano (3...Bc5), Evans Gambit (3...Bc5 4.b4), and Two Knights Defense (3...Nf6). 

According to Harding and Botterill, "The Hungarian Defence can only be played for a draw. White should have an edge in most lines."

The opening is seldom seen in modern play. It has been played on occasion by some grandmasters with strong defensive-, including Reshevsky, Hort, and former world champions Petrosian and Smyslov.

The variation takes its name from a correspondence game between Paris and Pest, Hungary, played from 1842 to 1845, but was first analyzed by Cozio in the 18th century.

Main line: 4.d4
Other moves pose fewer problems for Black: 4.c3 Nf6 (Steinitz), or 4.0-0 Nf6 5.Nc3 d6 6.d4 Bg4. After 4.d4, Black continues either 4...exd4 or 4...d6.

4...exd4
After 4...exd4, 5.Nxd4 would transpose into a variation of the Scotch Game that gives White a spatial advantage. Weaker is 5.c3, hoping for 5...dxc3 6.Qd5, after which Black resigned in the game Midjord–Scharf, Nice Olympiad 1974 (though Black could have tried 6...Nh6 7.Bxh6 0-0 when 8.Bc1 Nb4 9.Qd1 c2 wins back the piece, so White should play 8.Bxg7 Kxg7 9.Nxc3 with advantage). Also  is 5...Nf6 6.e5 Ne4 (the Tartakower Variation) 7.Bd5 Nc5 8.cxd4 Ne6 (Evans), but after 9.Bb3 White has the upper hand (Unzicker).

4...d6
Alternatively, Black generally tries to hold the center with 4...d6, when White has a choice of plans, each of which should be enough to secure a slight advantage. White can simplify to a slightly better queenless middlegame with 5.dxe5 dxe5 (5...Nxe5? 6.Nxe5 dxe5 7.Qh5! and White's  on e5 and f7 wins a pawn) 6.Qxd8+ (6.Bd5 is also possible) Bxd8 7.Nc3 Nf6, or 7...f6. Finally, with 5.Nc3 White can retain  in the center and obtain active piece play.

See also
 List of chess openings
 List of chess openings named after places

References

Bibliography

 

Chess openings
1842 in chess